This is a list in alphabetical order of male cricketers who have played for Surrey County Cricket Club in top-class matches since it was founded in 1845. The club is one of the first-class counties competing in the County Championship and its matches are classified as first-class cricket. It has been classified as a List A team since the beginning of limited overs cricket in 1963 and classified as a top-level Twenty20 team since the inauguration of the Twenty20 Cup in 2003.

The details are the player's usual name followed by the years in which he was active as a Surrey player and then his name is would appear on modern match scorecards. Note that many players represented other top-class teams besides Surrey. Current players are shown as active to the latest season in which they played for the club.

The list does not include Surrey women cricketers, and excludes Second XI and other players who did not play for the club's first team and players whose first team appearances were in minor matches only.

A

B

C

D

E
 Guy Earle (1911–1921) : G. F. Earle
 Alfred Earnshaw (1847) : A. Earnshaw
 George Earnshaw (1880) : G. R. B. Earnshaw
 John Edrich (1958–1978) : J. H. Edrich
 Frank Edwards (1909) : F. Edwards
 George Edwards (2011–2013) : G. A. Edwards
 Mike Edwards (1961–1974) : M. J. Edwards
 Richard Eglington (1938) : R. Eglington
 Dean Elgar (2015, 2018–2019) : D. Elgar
 Grant Elliott (2009) : G. D. Elliott
 George Elliott (1875–1880) : G. F. Elliott
 George Estridge (1859–1860) : G. T. Estridge
 Laurie Evans (2009–2010, 2020) : L. J. Evans

F

G

H

I
 Iftikhar Anjum (2010) : Iftikhar Anjum
 Imran Tahir (2019) : Imran Tahir
 Intikhab Alam (1969-1981) : Intikhab Alam

J

K

L

M

N

O
 Kevin O'Brien (2013–2014) : K. J. O'Brien
 Joseph O'Gorman (1927) : J. G. O'Gorman
 Pragyan Ojha (2011) : P. P. Ojha
 Frederick Oliver (1855–1856) : F. W. Oliver
 James Ormond (2002–2008) : J. Ormond
 Jamie Overton (2020) : J. Overton
 Glyn Owen (1930–1933) : J. G. Owen
 Dudley Owen-Thomas (1970–1979) : D. R. Owen-Thomas

P

R

S

T

V
 Freddie van den Bergh (2011–2014, 2017–2019) : F. O. E. van den Bergh
 Alan Verrinder (1974–1976) : A. O. C. Verrinder
 Herbert Vigar (1906–1911) : H. E. Vigar
 John Vince (1870) : J. Vince
 John Vincett (1921) : J. H. Vincett
 Amar Virdi (2017–2020) : G. S. Virdi
 Adolph von Ernsthausen (1900–1901) : A. C. E. von Ernsthausen 	
 Ralph Voss (1883–1886) : R. Voss
 Edmund Vyse (1857) : E. W. Vyse

W

Y
 Yasir Arafat (2011) : Yasir Arafat
 G. Yates (1851–1854) : G. Yates
 Rex Yeatman (1946–1947) : R. H. Yeatman
 Younis Ahmed (1965–1978) : Younis Ahmed
 Younis Khan (2010) : Younus Khan

Z
 Zaheer Khan (2004) : Zaheer Khan

See also
 List of Surrey cricket captains

Notes

References

Players

Surrey
Cricketers